Devaki Pandit (born 6 March 1965) is an Indian classical singer.

With melody in her voice and charm in her persona, Devaki Pandit has developed her own unique style of singing and has won many hearts through her endearing performances.

Early life
Born in a household with phenomenal performers in her lineage, Devaki Pandit was exposed to a plethora of art. Sharing her humble beginnings Devaki says, "Beauty in music emerges from the total, complete self-surrender to the Swar. My journey with music is to attain that Beauty through Sadhana, practice. I understood this co-relation at very early age as I was surrounded by artists musicians, actors, authors who lived with this truth every moment 
My maternal grandmother Mangala Ranade and her sisters hailed from Goa and were renowned musicians, singers."

Career
Devaki Pandit is a Disciple of Padma Vibhushan Ganasaraswati  Kishori Amonkar and Padmashree Pt. Jitendra Abhisheki. Her Gayaki is thus influenced by her legendary gurus and their unique aesthetic approach to music. She was initiated into music by her mother Smt. Usha Pandit. She received her formal training at the age of 9 from Pt. Vasantrao Kulkarni. Later she also received guidance under Pt Babanrao Haldankar of Agra gharana and Dr Arun Dravid, who is also a disciple of Gaansaraswati Kishoritai Amonkar. She Says "My mother Usha Pandit, my 1st Guru, also a disciple of  Pt. Jitendra Abhisheki, taught me the basics of music but always tested me time and again; whether I had the perseverance to remain dedicated to an intense, lifelong commitment with Music. This vigilant and self-analytical approach helped me in my pursuit to acquire knowledge from great legendary gurus."

Music is known to surpass all boundaries, and it was no different with Devaki Pandit. With training from the Agra Gharana, she started singing professionally by twelve years of age when she recorded for a children's album. With learning the intricacies from her mother and her gurus, Devaki flourished as an accomplished singer. Her keen sensibilities and eagerness to achieve versatility led her to sing various forms such as bhajans, ghazals, abhangas, songs for films apart from Indian classical music.

She went on to collaborate with renowned artists such as Pt. Hridaynath Mangeshkar, Ustad Rais Khan, Gulzar, Vishal Bhardwaj, Naushad, Jaidev, Jatin–Lalit, Ustad Zakir Hussain in the field of films, television, and live classical performances.

Musical Journey

Hindustani Classical
Tana Riri has been composed by Devaki Pandit
 Deepti (Legendary Legacy)
 Inner Soul (Ninaad)
 Sandesh (Ninaad)
 Raag- Lalit/ Anand Bhairav/ Pancham Hindol (Alurkar)
 Raag- Shree/ Kamod/ Bahar (Alurkar)
 Reverence (Times Music)
 Tana Riri (Times Music)

Devotional/Spiritual
Devaki Pandit composed Shreeramraksha Stotram, Aradhana Mahakali & Ganaadheesh. She sang the Ram Raksha Stotra in 32 different Hindustani Classical Raagas.

 Krishna (NA Classical)
 Mohane Man Haryo (Nadarang Music)
 Shreeramraksha Stotram (NA Classical)
 Ganaadheesh (Times Music)
 Bhajanavali (Sa Re Ga Ma)
 Sharanagat (NA Classical)
 Sumiran (NA Classical)
 Sree Lalita Sahasranama (Times Music)
 Upanishad Amrut (Sony)
 Krishna Raas Geet (Times Music)
 Vrindavan (Times Music)
 Aradhana Mahakali (Music Today)
 Krishna Utsav (Sony)
 Sampoorna Shiv Aradhana (Times Music)
 Devi Aavahan (EMI)
 Santoshi Mata Vrat Katha (Vale Music)
 Mangla Prabhati (Vale Music)

 Shree Durga Stuti (Vale Music)
 Vande Prathamesha (Vale Music)
 Omkar Mantras (Vale Music)
 Morning Mantras (Vale Music)
 Himalayan Chants (Vale Music)
 Himalayan Chants 2 (Times Music)
 Ganapati Jagvandan (Times Music)
 Shree Shani Jagrata (Times Music)
 Sacred Mantras Of India (Times Music/Sona Rupa UK)
 Divine Chants of Gayatri (Sona Rupa UK)
 Chants Of India (Times Music)
 The Power Of Gayatri (Times Music/Sona Rupa UK)
 Jai Shree Hanuman (Sona Rupa UK)
 Ashta Prahar (Sona Rupa UK)
 Blessings For Parenthood (Times Music)

 Krishnavali: Divine Chants of Krishna (Times Music/Sona Rupa)
 Shri Krishna Hari (Times Music/Sona Rupa)
 Shiv (Sur Sagar)
 Mantras for Peace & Prosperity (Times Music)

Marathi
 Sadabahar Geete- Vol I & II (Fountain)
 Anmol Gaani (Sa Re Ga Ma)
 Gurukrupa
 Dayaghana Panduranga (Fountain)
 Saangu Kunaas Hee Preet (Fountain)
 Saajana (Fountain)
 Saare Tuzhyaat Aahe (Fountain)
 Gaanara Zaad (Fountain)
 Goad Tujhe Roop (Times Music)
 Shabda Swaranchy Chandnyat (Fountain)
 Man Muthitun Gharangalatana (RPG)

Hindi/Urdu
 Halka Nasha (with Hariharan) (Magnasound)
 Suno Zara (Times Music)
 "Phir bhor bhayee,  jaga madhuban" of Saaz (film) which was composed by renowned Tabla maestro Zakir Hussain (musician).

Awards and Recognitions
 Kesarbai Kerkar Scholarship - the only person to receive it twice consecutively
 1986 - Maharashtra State Award for "Best Female Playback Singer" (Film : Ardhangi)
 2001 and 2002 - Alpha Gaurav Puraskar
 2002 - Maharashtra Government Award for "Best Female Playback Singer"
 2002 - Mewati Gharana Award
 2006 - Aditya Birla Kala Kiran Award

External links
 
 Sound of India - Note on Devaki Pandit and Music
 

Living people
Hindustani singers
Indian women playback singers
Indian women classical singers
Singers from Maharashtra
Marathi playback singers
Bollywood playback singers
Marathi-language singers
1965 births
20th-century Indian singers
Women Hindustani musicians
20th-century Indian women singers
21st-century Indian singers
21st-century Indian women singers
Women musicians from Maharashtra